Westville is one of five primary historic neighborhoods of the city of Taunton, Massachusetts. Although these neighborhoods are not census-designated areas, they are municipally designated populated regions of the city.

Location 
Westville is located on the west end of the city bordering the Oakland and Weir neighborhoods, and the towns of Rehoboth and Dighton.

Transportation 
US Route 44 is the only major route within the Westville neighborhood. Route 44 serves as the main connecting road between Taunton and Providence, Rhode Island

Neighborhoods in Massachusetts
Populated places in Bristol County, Massachusetts
Taunton, Massachusetts